District 10 is an electoral district in Malta.  It was established in 1962. Its boundaries have changed many times but it currently consists of the localities of Gżira, Pembroke, St. Julian's, Sliema and part of Naxxar, and the hamlet of Baħar iċ-Cagħaq.

Representatives

Last Election

References 

 

Districts of Malta